Herbert Reynolds may refer to:
 Herbert Reynolds (lyricist) (1867–1933), Irish-American lyricist
 Herbert H. Reynolds (1930–2007, president of Baylor University
 Herbert J. Reynolds (1832–1916), member of the Indian Civil Service and the Legislative Council of Bengal

See also
 Herbert F. Raynolds (1874/75–1950), Justice of the New Mexico Supreme Court